is a Japanese anime that was broadcast from 2 April 1985 to 4 February 1986 with a total of 78 episodes produced. This anime is based on the 1902 novel Five Children and It by English author Edith Nesbit. 

The anime differs from the novel in revolving around four children rather than five. Three of the children (Cyril, Robert and Jane) are siblings while the fourth (Anne) is their friend and neighbor. The four children encounter the Psammead who, in the anime, is depicted as being yellow with a blue hat, and more of a grumpy and lazy being than mischievous. 

In Latin America and Spain, the series was known as Samed, el duende mágico ("Psammead, the magic goblin") and in France and Quebec as Sablotin. In the Arab world, it was known as Moghamarat Samid ("Samid's adventures").

External links
  Samed, el duende mágico

 

1985 anime television series debuts
1989 anime films
Fantasy anime and manga
Television shows based on children's books
Television about fairies and sprites
TMS Entertainment
NHK original programming